A special election was held in  on October 1, 1810 to fill a vacancy in the 11th Congress left by the resignation, on May 14, 1810, of the previous incumbent, Roger Nelson (DR).  This election was held at the same time as the general election for the 12th Congress.

Election results

Ringgold also won election to the 12th Congress.  He took his seat in the 11th Congress on December 7, 1810

See also
List of special elections to the United States House of Representatives

References

Maryland 1810 04
Maryland 1810 04
1810 04
Maryland 04
United States House of Representatives
United States House of Representatives 1810 04